Shenyang Zhongze F.C. was a former professional Chinese football club that participated in the Chinese League One division.

History
The club was founded in August 2009 as Tianjin Runyulong and was initially set-up as an amateur football team to take part in the amateur leagues. At the beginning of the 2011 league season, Tianjin Runyulong would decide to take over Anhui Jiufang and took their position in the China League One division. The club would make Liu Zhicai their first professional manager and play in the 18,000-seat Minyuan Stadium in Tianjin while wearing an all red strip within their debut season. The club would quickly find out that the full acquisition of Anhui Jiufang as well as the running cost of the club would cost them 540 million yuan, more than the club expected and that they would need to quickly find investment if they were to pay their players on time. The investment would come from the local Shenbei government who wanted them to move into the 30,000-seat Tiexi Stadium in Shenyang. In July 2011, Tianjin Runyulong moved to the city of Shenyang and the name changed to Shenyang Shenbei.

Shenyang Zhongze failed to transfer of ownership after they finished 11th of League One in the 2014 season. On 15 January 2015, it is reported that they gave up to register for the 2015 league season and dissolved. However, Shenyang Zhongze appeared on the list of registered clubs for the 2015 league season several days later. Shenyang Zhongze was officially dissolved on 27 February 2015.

Results
All-time league rankings

As of the end of 2014 season.

Key
<div>

 Pld = Played
 W = Games won
 D = Games drawn
 L = Games lost
 F = Goals for
 A = Goals against
 Pts = Points
 Pos = Final position

 DNQ = Did Not Qualify
 DNE = Did Not Enter
 NH = Not Held
 – = Does Not Exist
 R1 = Round 1
 R2 = Round 2
 R3 = Round 3
 R4 = Round 4

 F = Final
 SF = Semi-finals
 QF = Quarter-finals
 R16 = Round of 16
 Group = Group stage
 GS2 = Second Group stage
 QR1 = First Qualifying Round
 QR2 = Second Qualifying Round
 QR3 = Third Qualifying Round

Notable players
Had international caps for their respective countries.

Europe
 Vladimir Vujović
 Zoran Rendulić

References

External links
Official club website 

Defunct football clubs in China
Association football clubs established in 2009
Association football clubs disestablished in 2015
Sport in Shenyang
2009 establishments in China
2015 disestablishments in China
Football clubs in Liaoning